Kindbergia praelonga, known as common feather-moss, is a species of moss belonging to the family Brachytheciaceae. It is a medium to large size moss with pinnate leaves. The species is of interest for having properties that may be beneficial for human health.

The species is found worldwide in moist to wet habitats. It is one of the most common mosses in lowland Great Britain.

Eurhynchium praelongum var. stokesii and Kindbergia brittoniae were formerly classified within this species.

References

Hypnales